Virpi Juutilainen (born 11 June 1961) is a Finnish ski-orienteering competitor and world champion.

She received an individual gold medal in the long distance at the 1988 World Ski Orienteering Championships in Kuopio, and a gold medal in the short course in Val di Non in 1994. In 1988, she also won a gold medal in the relay at the World Championships, together with team mates Sirpa Kukkonen and Anne Benjaminsen. 

She finished first overall in the World Cup in Ski Orienteering in 1989, and third in 1991.

See also
 Finnish orienteers
 List of orienteers
 List of orienteering events

References

1961 births
Living people
Finnish orienteers
Female orienteers
Ski-orienteers